Mycolicibacter kumamotonensis (formerly Mycobacterium kumamotonense) is a species of bacteria.
Etymology: kumamotonensis, pertaining to Kumamoto Prefecture in Japan, where the type strain was isolated.

Description
Slowly growing, nonchromogenic.

Pathogenesis

Type strain
First isolated in Kumamoto Prefecture, Japan from a clinical specimen.

References

External links
Type strain of M. kumamotonensis at BacDive -  the Bacterial Diversity Metadatabase

Acid-fast bacilli
kumamotonensis
Bacteria described in 2007